Jind State (also spelled Jhind State) was a princely state located in the Punjab region of north-western India. Jind was founded and ruled by Jat Sikh rulers of Sidhu clan.

History

Origin 
The ruling house of Jind belonged to the Phulkian dynasty, sharing a common ancestor named Tiloka with the Nabha rulers. Tiloka was the eldest son of Phul Sidhu of the Phulkian Misl. The Nabha rulers descend from Sukhchain Singh, the younger son of Tiloka. The Jind State was founded in 1763.

British era 
It was part of the Cis-Sutlej states until 25 April 1809, when it became a British protectorate.
On 20 August 1948, with the signing of the instrument of accession, Jind became a part of the Patiala and East Punjab States Union. Jind town and district now form a part of Indian state of Haryana.

Postage stamps prior to King George V consisted of Indian stamps over printed as "Jhind State", with the letter 'H' in the name. On the George V stamps, the 'H' is omitted and is overprinted as "Jind State" (Reference actual stamps from the Victorian, Edward VII and George V eras).

List of rulers

Demographics

Religion

Gallery

See also
Political integration of India
 Phulkian sardars
 Patiala State
 Nabha State
 Faridkot State
 Malaudh
 Bhadaur
 Kaithal
 Cis-Sutlej states

Notes

References

External links

States and territories disestablished in 1948
Princely states of India
History of Haryana
Jind district
1763 establishments in India
1948 disestablishments in India